Iličić is a surname. Notable people with the surname include:

 Josip Iličić (born 1988), Slovenian football player of Bosnian Croat descent
 Miroslav Iličić (born 1998), Croatian football player

See also
 Ilinčić

Croatian surnames